Parahyagnis is a genus of beetles in the family Cerambycidae, containing the following species:

 Parahyagnis bifuscoplagiata 
 Parahyagnis ficivora

References

Apomecynini
Taxa named by Stephan von Breuning (entomologist)